= Michel Borwicz =

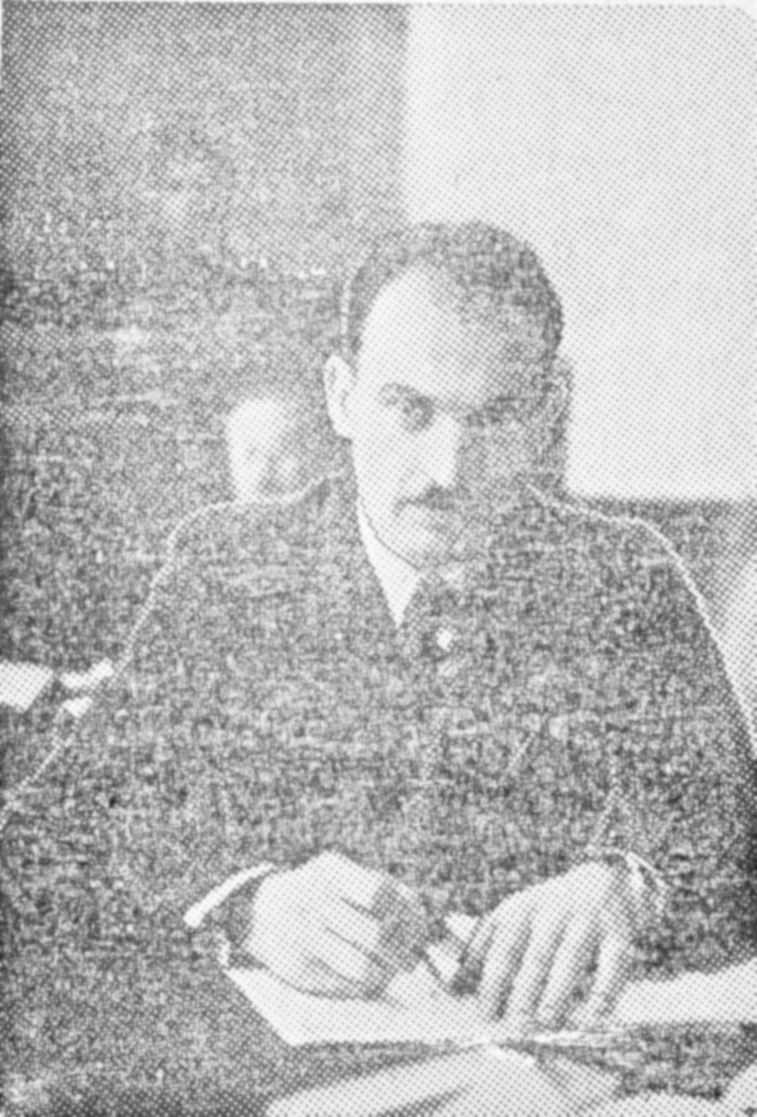
Michał Borwicz, deputy director of the Central Jewish Historical Commission in Poland

Michel (in Polish, Michał) Borwicz—born Maksymilian Boruchowicz on October 11, 1911, in Tarnów, Poland and died on August 31, 1987, in Nice, France—was a Polish-Jewish poet and writer who wrote in Polish, French, and Yiddish. He was also an active member of the Polish resistance. World War II—and specifically the war in Poland—lies at the heart of his works.

== Biography ==
Michel Borwicz was born on October 11, 1911, in Tarnów, Poland. He came from a lower-middle-class family in Kraków that, despite its Jewish cultural background, was considered secular.

=== World War II and Resistance ===
In 1939, he fled the advancing German army and settled in Soviet-occupied Lwów. He became a member of the Soviet-established Association of Jewish Writers. It was there that his interest in Yiddish literature developed.Following the German occupation of Lwów (June 1941), he was imprisoned in 1942 at the Janowska concentration camp, located in the western suburbs (near the railway station). There, he witnessed summary executions taking place behind the camp's barracks.During his imprisonment, he wrote poems that would be published after the war and organized literary evenings intended both to brighten camp life and to recruit members for the resistance.

=== After World War II ===
Between 1945 and 1947, he directed the Kraków branch of the Central Jewish Historical Commission, editing numerous works on the Holocaust. Notably, he edited the memoirs of Janina Hescheles. In doing so, he engaged in historical work concerning both his own personal history and the literature that emerged from that history.

In September 1946, he participated in the exhumation of the Warsaw Ghetto archives, which had been buried in the rubble.
